Events in the year 2022 in Gabon.

Incumbents 

 President: Ali Bongo Ondimba
 Prime Minister: Rose Christiane Ossouka Raponda

Events 
Ongoing: COVID-19 pandemic in Gabon
 25 June – Gabon and Togo officially become members of the Commonwealth of Nations.

Deaths 

 5 May – Théodore Nzue Nguema, 48, football player.

References 

 
2020s in Gabon
Years of the 21st century in Gabon
Gabon